The Shorter Sukhāvatīvyūha Sūtra (Chinese: Fóshuō Āmítuójīng 佛說阿彌陀經, Taisho no. 366, Vietnamese: Phật Thuyết Kinh A Di Đà) is one of the two Indian Mahayana sutras that describe Sukhavati, the pure land of Amitābha. This text is highly influential in East Asian Buddhism, including China, Korea, Japan, and Vietnam. 

The original Sanskrit versions of the Shorter Sukhāvatīvyūha Sūtra and Longer Sukhāvatīvyūha Sūtra were translated into English by Luis Gomez in The Land of Bliss.

History
The Shorter Sukhāvatīvyūha Sūtra was translated from Sanskrit into Classical Chinese by Tripiṭaka master Kumārajīva in 402, but may have existed in India as early as the year 100 in a Prakrit.

Content
The bulk of the Shorter Sukhāvatīvyūha Sūtra, considerably shorter than other Pure Land sutras, consists of a discourse which Gautama Buddha gave at Jetavana in Śrāvastī to his disciple Śāriputra. The talk concerned the wondrous adornments that await the righteous in the western pure land of Sukhāvatī as well as the beings that reside there, including the buddha Amitābha. The text also describes what one must do to be reborn there.

English translations
 Gomez, Luis, trans. (1996), The Land of Bliss: The Paradise of the Buddha of Measureless Light: Sanskrit and Chinese Versions of the Sukhavativyuha Sutras, Honolulu: University of Hawaii Press

See also
 Longer Sukhāvatīvyūha Sūtra (Infinite Life Sutra)
 Sukhavati
 Amitābha

References 

Mahayana sutras
Pure Land Buddhism
Funerary texts